John Gyles (died c. 1406) of Dover, Kent, was an English politician.

Family
He was married, but his wife's name is unrecorded. He had two sons, Peter, a clerk, and Thomas, an MP and king's esquire.

Career
By 1366, he was a tavern owner and in 1368 he was fined 10s for stabbing a man with a dagger. He attended the coronation of Richard II of England as a canopy bearer.

He was a Member (MP) of the Parliament of England for Dover in 1385, 1386, February 1388, September 1388, January 1390, 1391, 1393, 1395 and 1399. He was Mayor of Dover during the periods September 1382 – 1384, 1389–1391, 1392–3, 1399–1400 and 1401–2.

References

14th-century births
1406 deaths
English MPs 1385
English MPs 1386
Members of the Parliament of England for Dover
Mayors of Dover
English MPs February 1388
English MPs September 1388
English MPs January 1390
English MPs 1391
English MPs 1393
English MPs 1395
English MPs 1399